Wladimir Klitschko vs. Hasim Rahman, billed as "X-Plosive", was a professional boxing match contested on  13 December 2008 for the IBF, WBO, and IBO heavyweight championship.

Background
After unifying the IBF & WBO title by defeating Sultan Ibragimov, Wladimir Klitschko made one title defence against WBO mandatory challenger Tony Thompson before agreeing to face his IBF mandatory Alexander Povetkin. In October 2008 Povetkin withdrew with a leg injury, and with the second and third ranked contenders Alexander Dimitrenko and Chris Arreola unavailable, Klitschko agreed to face former unified champion and fourth ranked IBF contender Hasim Rahman.

Before agreeing to face Klitschko, Rahman had won four of his five fights since losing his WBC title in a close fight to Oleg Maskaev, the fifth was a no contest with James Toney. He was the NABF continental champion, having defeated Zuri Lawrence for the title in 2007, and was retroactively ranked the world's 8th best heavyweight that year by BoxRec.https://[boxrec.com/media/index.php/Wladimir_Klitschko_vs._Hasim_Rahman BoxRec: Wladimir Klitschko vs. Hasim Rahman.] He was also ranked within the top ten by both the IBF and WBO, and 12th by the WBC. He was aiming to join Muhammad Ali, Evander Holyfield, and Lennox Lewis as the only boxers ever to win a heavyweight title on three or more occasions.

On the undercard, former Undisputed Heavyweight Champion Riddick Bowe fought what would turn out to be the final fight of his career, beating journeyman Gene Pukall by an 8-round unanimous decision.

The fight

Klitschko dominated the fight winning every round on the scorecards (two judges had it 60-53, the third scored it 60-47), scoring a knockdown the 6th round with a series of jabs followed by a right hand to the chin of Rahman who survived before referee Tony Weeks ended the fight in the seventh round. According to CompuBox Klitschko landed 178 punches with 48% accuracy, against Rahman's 30 punches with 14% accuracy.

Aftermath
After his victory, Klitschko agreed to face former unified cruiserweight champion David Haye in Germany in June 2009, however, Haye pulled out and was replaced by the WBA "Champion In recess" Ruslan Chagaev.

Rahman would spend 15 months out of the ring after this fight before returning to knockout his next five opponents before losing in two rounds to Povetkin. He would retire after a decision loss to the unknown Anthony Nansen in June 2014.

Undercard
Confirmed bouts:

Broadcasting

References

2008 in boxing
International Boxing Federation heavyweight championship matches
World Boxing Organization heavyweight championship matches
Klitschko brothers
December 2008 sports events in Europe
Sports competitions in Mannheim
Boxing in Germany
2008 in German sport
Boxing matches